The Space Between Us is a 2017 American romantic science fiction film directed by Peter Chelsom and written by Allan Loeb, from a story by Stewart Schill, Richard Barton Lewis, and Loeb. The film stars Gary Oldman, Asa Butterfield, Britt Robertson, and Carla Gugino, and follows a teenage boy, born on Mars, who travels to Earth.

Principal photography began on September 14, 2015, in Albuquerque, New Mexico. The film was released on February 3, 2017 by STXfilms. It received negative reviews from critics and was a box office bomb, grossing $14.8 million against its $30 million budget.

Plot 
Multi-billionaire Nathaniel Shepard, CEO of Genesis, launches the first mission to colonize Mars. During the journey, astronaut Sarah Elliot discovers she is pregnant. She gives birth to Gardner after landing on Mars, and dies shortly afterwards from eclampsia; the father is unknown. Gardner is kept on Mars as a secret; they fear a public relations disaster and returning to Earth could be dangerous to his health. Gardner is raised by astronaut Kendra Wyndham and the other scientists on Mars.

Sixteen years later, Gardner hacks into a robot he helped build to gain access to his mother's personal belongings. He finds a wedding ring and a video of Sarah and a man in a beach house. Convinced that the man is his father, Gardner becomes determined to find him. He regularly uses an Internet chatroom to talk to Tulsa, a street-smart girl from Colorado living in the foster-care system. Gardner tells her he is confined to a penthouse due to osteogenesis imperfecta. They discuss their plans for the future and he promises to visit her someday.

Kendra video calls Nathaniel and Genesis director, Tom Chen; she says that Gardner is extremely intelligent and wants him to be allowed to go to Earth. Nathaniel refuses; Gardner would have to have a risky surgery to increase his bone density and train to adapt to Earth's atmospheric pressure. He both undergoes the surgery and training against Nathaniel's wishes and boards a shuttle for Earth with Kendra and several other astronauts.

When they arrive on Earth, Nathaniel is angry at Tom who kept Gardner's training a secret. Gardner is quarantined at NASA while undergoing medical tests to determine his fitness for life on Earth. He escapes before seeing the tests showing he cannot live on Earth very long, and finds Tulsa convincing her to help him find his father. 

They are followed by Nathaniel and Kendra, who try to convince Gardner to return to NASA but he runs away with Tulsa and learns the location of the man who married his parents, Shaman Neka. Nathaniel and Kendra learn that Gardner's body contains dangerously high levels of troponin, indicative of an enlarged heart, which cannot withstand the atmospheric pressure of Earth; he must return to Mars immediately if he is to survive.

Gardner confesses his true origins to Tulsa, who does not believe him. They find Neka, who lets Tulsa use his computer to locate the beach house from Gardner's video. They travel to Summerland, California, stopping in Las Vegas for fun, where Gardner collapses and is taken to a hospital. X-rays show carbon tubes in his bones, and Tulsa finally believes Gardner's claims of being born on Mars. 

Gardner knows he cannot survive on Earth and wants to meet his father before he dies. Tulsa helps him sneak out of the hospital and they drive to the beach house; they meet the man from Gardner's video who is actually his uncle, not his father. Gardner thinks this is a lie and runs to the sea, telling Tulsa that this is where he wants to die before collapsing.

Nathaniel and Kendra arrive in time to save Gardner and pull him out of the ocean. Gardner asks Nathaniel about Sarah, realizing Nathaniel is his father. They rush him to a Dream Chaser and launch into orbit, hoping this will stabilize Gardner. Free of Earth's gravity, he is revived.

Soon after, Gardner boards a space shuttle to Mars after sharing an emotional parting with Tulsa. Kendra, who is retiring from active flight status with NASA, adopts her. Determined to join him on Mars, Tulsa joins Kendra's training program. Gardner is seen back on Mars with Nathaniel.

Cast

Production 
In 1999, Universal Pictures and Mike Lobell Productions acquired a screenplay, then titled Mainland, about a rebellious teen born on the moon who desired to come to the earth but whose physiology, it was feared, would not be able to survive the transition. After failed rewrites by Allison Burnett (Autumn in New York), the project was placed on hiatus, as Lobell left Universal for a deal at Castle Rock Entertainment. The project remained unproduced for over a decade.

On March 13, 2014, an industry source revealed that a science fiction-adventure film titled Out of This World was in development at Relativity Media, scripted by Allan Loeb. Later in August 2014, it was reported that Peter Chelsom, who had previously directed Hector and the Search for Happiness for Relativity, was hired to direct the film, while Relativity would produce and distribute. Southpaw Entertainment's Richard B. Lewis was attached to produce the film, and also received a "story by" credit.

On February 2, 2015, Asa Butterfield was tapped to play the lead character in the film, a teen who was raised on Mars, and who falls in love with a girl on Earth he has been communicating with. Chelsom and Tinker Lindsay rewrote the screenplay. On July 13, 2015, it was announced that Relativity was selling the project to STX Entertainment, in order to reach an agreement with its creditors and avoid having to file for bankruptcy. STX produced and distributed the film. On July 31, 2015, Gary Oldman, Carla Gugino, and Britt Robertson joined the cast of the then-untitled film. Robertson would play the female lead, a teen girl from Colorado. On September 8, 2015, it was announced that the title of the film would be The Space Between Us, and B. D. Wong and Janet Montgomery were added to the cast. On September 30, 2015, Trey Tucker joined the film to play an astronaut, and on October 23, 2015, Scott Takeda was cast to play a doctor in the film.

The actors Asa Butterfield (20 years old at the time of the film's release) and Britt Robertson (27 at the time) have a seven-year age gap between them, greater than their respective characters (both of whom are around 16 or 17), which caused controversy, but in an interview Robertson explains that the age difference helped with the dynamic of the relationship between Tulsa and Gardner: "I don't think Tulsa is really a teenager. She's had to be an adult for a really long time. She's had to take care of herself. She's had to figure out where she's going to live, and pay her mortgage or gas. She thinks like an adult. There's this dynamic where she's almost parenting him in some ways. There's this very specific kind of thing where she's teaching him about the world (saying), 'Get it together, these are people. Why are you doing it this way? Why aren't you being human?' [Our age difference] I think really helps the dynamic. It's not something I really pay attention to."

Principal photography on the film began on September 14, 2015, in Albuquerque, New Mexico.

Decathlon diving masks were used as ordinary masks for the team that helps the returning astronauts out of the spaceship.

Andrew Lockington composed the film's score, which was released through Sony Music Entertainment.

Release 
In August 2015, STX Entertainment scheduled the film to be released on July 29, 2016. The release date was later switched with STX's other release, Bad Moms, and was moved its release date later to August 19, 2016. However, Kubo and the Two Strings, Ben-Hur, and War Dogs were all slated for August 19, 2016 and STX Entertainment moved its release date later to December 21, 2016, allowing more time for work on the visual effects. The film's release date was later moved to December 16, 2016, and finally STX Entertainment moved its release date later to February 3, 2017.

Box office 
The Space Between Us grossed $7.9 million in the United States and Canada and $6.9 million in other territories for a worldwide total of $14.8 million, against a production budget of $30 million.

In North America, The Space Between Us was released alongside Rings and The Comedian, and was projected to gross $8–10 million from 2,812 theaters during its opening weekend. The film ended up grossing $1.4 million on its first day and $3.8 million in its opening weekend, finishing well below expectations, and 7th at the box office. In its third weekend the film grossed $260,000 after being pulled from 2,441 theaters (dropping 84.6% to 331), marking the 11th biggest theater drop in history.

Critical response 
On Rotten Tomatoes, the film has an approval rating of 16% based on 136 reviews, with an average rating of 4.3/10. The site's critical consensus reads, "The Space Between Us strands its star-crossed young lovers in a mind-numbingly vast expanse of shameless cheese that will send all but the most forgiving viewers eye-rolling for the exits." On Metacritic, the film holds a score 33 out of 100, based on 32 critics, indicating "generally unfavorable reviews". Audiences polled by CinemaScore gave the film an average grade of "A−" on an A+ to F scale.

Writing for IndieWire, David Ehrlich gave the film a grade of "C," calling it a "guileless and good-natured sci-fi love story". Kevin Maher gave a scathing review in The Times, writing that the film is "notable only for some horrendously bad science and a career-low performance from Gary Oldman".

Accolades

See also 
 List of films set on Mars

References

External links 
 
 

2017 films
2010s adventure films
2010s romance films
2010s science fiction adventure films
Films directed by Peter Chelsom
Films scored by Andrew Lockington
Films shot in New Mexico
American science fiction adventure films
American science fiction films
American space adventure films
American teen romance films
STX Entertainment films
American pregnancy films
Huayi Brothers films
Films about NASA
Films about adoption
Films about orphans
Films about space hazards
Films set in Florida
Films set in California
Films set in Colorado
Films set in the Las Vegas Valley
Films set in 2018
Films set in 2036
Osteogenesis imperfecta in films
Mars in film
Films with screenplays by Allan Loeb
2010s American films